"Tattooed Millionaire" is the first single from Bruce Dickinson's debut solo album, Tattooed Millionaire. It was released on 11 April 1990. "Tattooed Millionaire" reached number 18 on the UK charts. The promotional video was directed by Storm Thorgerson. According to Ultimate Classic Rock, the song is about "celebrity tabloid rockers". A 1990 review published in The Georgia Straight, says the song takes a not-so-subtle stab at the excesses of the L.A. rock ’n’ roll lifestyle, particularly that led by Vince Neil and his Motley gang. Nikki Sixx has said that he heard the song is about him, inspired by Dickinson's then-wife cheating on him with Sixx, though Sixx claims Dickinson found out about the affair after reading The Dirt.

Track listing 
 Tattooed Millionaire – 4:29  
 Ballad of Mutt – 3:37  
 Winds of Change – 3:23

Personnel
 Bruce Dickinson – vocals
 Janick Gers – guitar
 Andy Carr – bass
 Fabio Del Rio – drums

Chart positions

References

External links
 Bruce Dickinson explains what a Tattooed Millionaire is

1990 singles
Bruce Dickinson songs
Songs written by Bruce Dickinson
1990 songs
Sony Music singles